Lajos Reményi-Schneller (15 March 1892 – 24 August 1946) was a Hungarian politician, who served as Minister of Finance between 1938 and 1945. He started his career in 1923 as the director of the Hungarian Exchange Bank. He became representative in 1935. Kálmán Darányi appointed him Minister of Finance, Reményi-Schneller held this position until the end of the Second World War. His assignment was Minister of Economic from the Pál Teleki cabinet until the Miklós Kállay administration. He pursued Germanophile politics extremely, he regularly informed the Germans about the Hungarian political developments. During his ministership Reményi-Schneller significantly furthered the country's economic delivery with his function for the Nazi Germany.

After the fall of Budapest he tried to escape into Western Europe but the arrival American troops captured him with other members of the Arrow Cross Party's government. He was tried by the People's Tribunal in Budapest in open sessions and sentenced to death for war crimes and high treason. Reményi-Schneller was hanged in 1946 in Budapest.

References
 Magyar Életrajzi Lexikon

1892 births
1946 deaths
Politicians from Budapest
Arrow Cross Party politicians
Unity Party (Hungary) politicians
Hungarian fascists
Hungarian economists
Finance ministers of Hungary
Hungarian people of World War II
Hungarian people convicted of war crimes
Executed Hungarian collaborators with Nazi Germany
People executed by Hungary by hanging
Hungarian Nazis
People executed for war crimes